The Cirolanidae are a family of isopod crustaceans, including these genera:

Aatolana Bruce, 1993
Annina Budde-Lund, 1908
Antrolana Bowman, 1964
Aphantolana Moore & Brusca, 2003
Arubolana Botosaneanu & Stock, 1979
Atarbolana Bruce & Javed, 1987
Bahalana Carpenter, 1981
Baharilana Bruce & Svavarsson, 2003
Bathylana Kensley, 1989
Bathynomus A. Milne-Edwards, 1879
Booralana Bruce, 1986
Calyptolana Bruce, 1985
Cartetolana Bruce, 1981
Ceratolana Bowman, 1977
Cirolana Leach, 1818
Cirolanides Benedict, 1896
Colopisthus Richardson, 1902
Conilera Leach, 1818
Conilorpheus Stebbing, 1905
Creaseriella Rioja, 1953
Dodecalana Carpenter, 1994
Dolicholana Bruce, 1986
Eurydice Leach, 1815
Eurylana Jansen, 1981
Excirolana Richardson, 1912
Exumalana Botosaneanu & Iliffe, 2003
Faucheria Dollfus & Viré, 1905
Gnatholana Barnard, 1920
Hansenolana Stebbing, 1900
Haptolana Bowman, 1966
Kagalana Bruce, 2008
Kensleylana Bruce & Herrando-Perez, 2005
Limicolana Bruce, 1986
Marocolana Boulanouar, Boutin & Coineau, 1993
Metacirolana Nierstrasz, 1931
Mexilana Bowman, 1975
Natatolana Bruce, 1981
Neocirolana Hale, 1925
Odysseylana Malyutina, 1995
Oncilorpheus Paul & Menzies, 1971
Orphelana Bruce, 1981
† Palaega Woodward, 1870
Parabathynomus Barnard, 1924
Parilcirolana Yu & Li, 2001
Plakolana Bruce, 1993
Politolana Bruce, 1981
Pontogelos Stebbing, 1910
Pseudaega G. Thomson, 1883
Pseudolana Bruce, 1979
Saharolana Monod, 1930
Scutulana Bruce, 1996
Seychellana Kensley & Schotte, 1994
Sintorolana Bruce, 1996
Skotobaena Ferrara & Monod, 1972
Speocirolana Bolivar y Pieltain, 1950
Sphaerolana Cole & W. L. Minckley, 1970
Sphaeromides Dollfus, 1897
Turcolana Argano & Pesce, 1980
Typhlocirolana Racovitza, 1905
Xylolana Kensley, 1987
Yucatalana Botosaneanu & Iliffe, 1999
Zulialana Botosaneanu & Viloria, 1993

References

Cymothoida
Crustacean families
Taxa named by James Dwight Dana